The 15th Transport Aviation Brigade "Aircraft Designer Oleg Antonov" is a formation of the Ukrainian Air Force.

History

In 1995, the regiment received Antonov An-30B aircraft and personnel from the disbanded 86th Independent Long-Range Reconnaissance Squadron.

On February 17, 1997, the 1st ATR was reformed as the 15th Transport Aviation Brigade.

In 2001 the Brigade was known as 15th Aviation Special Purpose Brigade.

In 2008, officers of the unit restored the children's aircraft modeling laboratory from scratch.

Russo-Ukrainian war

Since the spring of 2014, the unit's servicemen have taken part in the war in eastern Ukraine.

On August 22, 2018, by the Decree of the President of Ukraine, the 15th Transport Aviation Brigade was awarded the honorary title "after the aircraft designer Oleg Antonov".

Components
1st Transport Squadron - Antonov An-26, a single Antonov An-24 and a single Tupolev Tu-134A-3. Its tasks are the transportation of cargo, personnel and senior members of the armed forces and the state.
2nd Aerial Photography Squadron “Blakytna stezha” - An-30B aircraft which carry out international observation missions under the “Open Skies” Treaty, performing aerial inspections.
3rd Helicopter Squadron - Mil Mi-8 of various versions for transportation of high-command officers and leaders of the state.

Aircraft
An-24
An-26
An-30
Tu-134
Mi-8

Operations
Participated in the war in Afghanistan from 1981, and performed both standard tasks, aerial photography of the territory for mapping and special tasks: visual monitoring of Mujahideen groups, vectoring of combat aircraft on weapon caravans and assistance in SAR operations. 
Brigade was involved in response Chernobyl nuclear power plant disaster.
Supported Ukrainian operations in UN missions in the former Yugoslavia, Iraq), and Africa (Angola, Sierra Leone.
Brigade have actively participated in anti-terrorist operations in East Ukraine.
International observation missions under the “Open Skies” Treaty, performing aerial inspections.

Accidents
On June 6, 2014, An-30B, airframe number 80, was shot down by Russian separatists over Slavyansk, Donetsk Oblast.
On March 20, 2017, 38-year-old warrant officer of the 15th brigade Ruslan Bondar died near Novotroitske, Donetsk region.

References 

Air force brigades of Ukraine